Built for Speed is the third studio album by Australian recording artist Adam Brand. The album was released in January 2002 and peaked at number 24 on the ARIA charts. It was certified platinum in 2009.

Track listing

Charts

Weekly charts

Year-end charts

Certifications

Release history

References

2002 albums
Adam Brand (musician) albums
Mushroom Records albums